Lauren Henderson may refer to:

Lauren Henderson (singer) (born 1986), American jazz singer
Lauren Henderson (writer) (born 1966), American author who also writes under the name Rebecca Chance